Vijay - Desh Ki Aankhen is an Army Themed show. Vijay premiered on NDTV Imagine on 26 June 2008.

Concept 
Vijay - Desh Ki Aankhen is show of army team "vijay" which fights with enemies.

Cast 
 Pankaj Kalra as Colonel Ranjit Singh
 Survinder Singh  as Major Kartar Singh
 Sagar Saini as Ajay
Chandan Madan as Sanjay
 Zeyaul Haque  as Nikhil
Kunal Bakshi as Karan
 Vijay Badlani  as Vishal
Irfan Hussain as Dinaroo(Evil)

External links 
Official Site

Indian television series
2008 Indian television series debuts
Imagine TV original programming
Indian Armed Forces in fiction